The Estrella Flyover, also known as the EDSA–Estrella Ramp and the Rockwell Flyover, is a two-lane flyover connecting Epifanio de los Santos Avenue (EDSA) and Estrella Street in Makati, Metro Manila, the Philippines, facilitating access to the Rockwell Center mixed-use development.

Built by Rockwell Land Corporation, the developer of Rockwell Center, construction of the flyover began in 1998, originally to facilitate direct northbound traffic flows to Rockwell Center from the Makati Central Business District and the Bonifacio Global City in Taguig via EDSA. Initial plans for managing traffic around the area with the flyover's construction were devised by local construction consultancy SMDI Consultants, while the flyover itself was originally designed by Katahira & Engineers Asia, taking into account the limited land area on which to build it partially due to the construction of the Manila Metro Rail Transit System (MRT).  Final plans for the flyover, however, were completed by Ove Arup & Partners, DCCD Engineering Corporation and CJG & Associates.

Although Department of Public Works and Highways (DPWH) Secretary Simeon Datumanong, Metropolitan Manila Development Authority (MMDA) Chairman Benjamin Abalos Sr., and Makati Mayor Jejomar Binay were invited to attend the inauguration, they were instead represented respectively at the event by DPWH Undersecretary Manuel Bonoan, MMDA General Manager Jaime Paz, and Makati Vice Mayor Ernesto Mercado, respectively.

The Estrella Flyover was originally one-way, but on December 21, 2012, the MMDA opened the flyover to two-way traffic from 7:00 to 10:00 am in order to ease traffic congestion as a result of cars turning right onto EDSA from Estrella Street.  Done in coordination with Rockwell Land, the move to two-way traffic was initiated in part because of increased traffic flows to the area as a result of the opening of the Estrella–Pantaleon Bridge in 2011. However, on September 5, 2016, the MMDA decided to return to one-way traffic.

References

Road interchanges in the Philippines